The 2017 Belgian Basketball Supercup, for sponsorship reasons the bpost Supercup, was the 20th edition of the annual super cup game in Belgian basketball. Oostende, winner of the 2016–17 Basketball League Belgium Division I, played against at Hubo Limburg United, runners-up of the 2016–17 Belgian Basketball Cup. 

The game was played at 16 September 2017 in the Sleuyter Arena in Ostend.

Match details
Oostende won its 10th Supercup, after Mike Myers hit the game-winning buzzer beater. Vincent Kesteloot was named the Most Valuable Player, after he recorded 14 points and 5 assists.

See also
2017–18 Basketball League Belgium Division I
2017–18 Belgian Basketball Cup

References

External links
Official website

2017
Supercup